Giorgia is the first album by Italian singer Giorgia, released in 1994.

Background 
Produced by Marco Rinalduzzi and Massimo Calabrese, Giorgia is the first official album by the prodigal Italian singer, Giorgia Todrani that contains 13 tracks: 9 original songs, a cover of Lucio Battisti's Nessun Dolore and two songs that she performed at Sanremo: Nasceremo, with which she won the contest Sanremo giovani in 1993; and E poi, the song that identifies her with the CD, performed at Sanremo in the Nuove Proposte section in 1994.

The album sold 170,000 copies, a remarkable achievement for a debut album, transforming Giorgia from an unknown but eminent talent, to one of the biggest names in Italian Pop. It includes the brief but intense song Alba, based on a poem written by Giorgia and the music of Marco Rinalduzzi and Massimo Calabrese.

The album is influenced by a black American type of music, mixed with the Italian style and the influence of Giorgia. At this time, Giorgia was starting to shape and create her experimental and perfectionistic style which characterised her career, becoming known as the style Clou which characterises music from that period and today.

The tracks have a mix of styles: Rhythm and Blues, Soul, Pop, Jazz and Rock, which at the time of its release was completely new and innovative in Italy. At just over 20 years old, Giorgia penned almost all of the lyrics (except for the cover of Nessun dolore). She took on themes such as the fear of living alone in E poi and Silenzioso amore, the difficulty in growing and maturing in the best way in society in Tuttinpiedi, Vorrei and M'hanno bocciato. In the track Stai (bimbo di domani) she converses with her future son about the world and what it will be like to live in it then. In addition, she covers other social and sentimental themes. The wide range of topics and musical texture resulted in a debut album with many artistic undertones; musically, vocally and lyrically, and remains the preferred album of many of Giorgia's fans.

Rereleased in 2005, to celebrate Giorgia's 10th anniversary, it reached the number two position on the Italian charts, resulting in the achievement of all of her albums having made the Top 10 in Italy.

Track listing

Personnel 
 Giorgia – vocals
 Massimo Calabrese – bass, backup vocals
 Alberto Bartoli – drums, percussion, tambourine, backup vocals
 Maria Grazia Fontana – Hammond organ, backup vocals
 Salvatore Corazza – drums
 Marco Rinalduzzi – acoustic guitar, electric guitar, classical guitar, keyboard, piano, backup vocals
 Fabio Pignatelli – bass
 Derek Wilson – drums
 Pino Favale – trumpet
 Pasquale Schembri – trumpet, backup vocals
 Alfredo Posillipo – trombone, backup vocals
 Franco Marinacci – baritone saxophone
 Ferruccio Corsi – contralto saxophone, tenor saxophone, soprano saxophone
 Claudia Arvati, Lilla Costarelli, Marco D'Angelo, Gloria Fegiz, Martino Fabrizio, Susanna Stivali, Tosca, Massimo Zuccaroli, Giulio Todrani, Charlie Cannon – backup vocals

References 

Giorgia (singer) albums
1994 debut albums